Sarakreek Airstrip  is an airstrip serving the gold mining community of Sarakreek, in the Brokopondo District of Suriname.

Charters and destinations 
Charter Airlines serving this airport are:

See also

 List of airports in Suriname
 Transport in Suriname

References

External links
OpenStreetMap - Sarakreek
Google Maps - Sarakreek
Gum Air landing in Sarakreek YouTube

Airports in Suriname
Sipaliwini District